Eilema kuatunica is a moth of the subfamily Arctiinae. It is found in China.

References

 Natural History Museum Lepidoptera generic names catalog

kuatunica